Kristyn Elizabeth Rebekah Getty ( Lennox, born 22 May 1980 in Belfast) is a Northern Irish Christian singer and songwriter. With her husband, Keith Getty, she has co-written a number of popular modern hymns.

Career

Keith and Kristyn Getty 

Kristyn and her husband Keith write and release hymns together.

Children's albums 
Kristyn together with her husband has written and produced a number of children's worship albums.

 2005: Songs That Jesus Said, a collection of songs for children
 2016: Getty Kids Hymnal: In Christ Alone
 2017: Getty Kids Hymnal: For the Cause
 2018: Getty Kids Hymnal: Family Hymn Sing
 2019: Getty Kids Hymnal: Family Carol Sing 2020: Evensong: Hymns and Lullabies at the Close of Day Recognition 
In 2017, Getty and her husband performed for US Vice-President Mike Pence and his wife Second Lady Karen Pence at the Vice-President's residence. In addition the couple have performed for President George W Bush, the United Nations, South Korean President Lee Myung-Bak, the Enthronement of the Archbishop of Canterbury and for former UK Prime Minister Theresa May.

Their song, "In Christ Alone" received BBC Songs of Praise number 3 on the top 10 charts in 2019, was number 1 for more than 15 years on the CCLI-UK charts and the CCLI-US top 20 for more than 13 consecutive years. The British Hymn Society named "In Christ Alone" as one of the top 5 hymns of all time.

According to CCLl, "In Christ Alone" ranks as the No.1 most-sung song in U.K. churches, and the 8th most-sung song in North American churches. Written by Townend and Getty 15 years ago, the song was also sited as the 9th "best loved hymn" in the UK according to a survey conducted by the BBC's "Songs of Praise" programme.

 Discography 
 2002: Tapestry Keith Getty and Kristyn Lennox (Getty) 2003: New Irish Hymns 2 (with Margaret Becker and Joanne Hogg) 2004: New Irish Hymns 3: Incarnation (with Margaret Becker and Joanne Hogg) 2005: New Irish Hymns 4 (with Margaret Becker and Joanne Hogg) 2005: Songs That Jesus Said; a collection of songs for children 2006: The Apostles' Creed 2006: Modern Hymns Live 2007: In Christ Alone with Keith Getty 2008: Prom Praise featured guest with the All Souls Orchestra; recorded live at Royal Albert Hall
 2008: Keswick Live with Keith Getty, Stuart Townend, and Steve James, recorded at the Keswick Convention
 2009: Awaken the Dawn with Keith Getty
 2011: Joy—An Irish Christmas with Keith Getty 2012: Hymns for the Christian Life with Keith Getty 2013: Modern and Traditional Hymns: Live at the Gospel Coalition with Keith Getty 2016: Facing a Task Unfinished with Keith Getty 2016: Getty Kids Hymnal: In Christ Alone 2017: Getty Kids Hymnal: For the Cause 2017:  Sing! Live from the Getty Music Worship Conference 2018: Psalms Ancient and Modern:  Live from the Getty Music Worship Conference 2018: The North Coast Sessions 2018: Getty Kids Hymnal: Family Hymn Sing 2019: His Mercy Is More  - The Hymns of Matt Boswell and Matt Papa
 2019: Getty Kids Hymnal: Family Carol Sing 2019/2020:  Quintology:  Sing! The Life of Christ 2020: Evensong: A Collection of Hymns and Lullabies at Close of Day 2021: Sing! Global (Live at the Getty Music Worship Conference) 2022: Christ Our Hope in Life and Death''

References

External links
 Official Getty Music Website
 "Singable Doctrine," an Interview with the Gettys by Stan Guthrie

1980 births
British performers of Christian music
Evangelicals from Northern Ireland
Christian hymnwriters
Performers of contemporary worship music
Women singers from Northern Ireland
Living people
People educated at Ballyclare High School
Musicians from Belfast
Women hymnwriters